Brinn John Bevan (born 16 June 1997) is a Welsh artistic gymnast. He was part of the first men's team from Great Britain to win a team medal at a World Gymnastics Championships in Glasgow on 28 October 2015. He was part of the British team to compete in the 2016 Rio de Janeiro Olympics.

Junior career
In 2012, Bevan was part of the gold winning team at the European Gymnastics Championships in Montpelier.

In 2014, he was again chosen for the junior team at the European Gymnastics Championships in Sofia, Bulgaria, where, besides helping to secure another gold for the British team, he won individual silver medals on parallel bars and still rings, and bronze in the all-around behind his teammate Nile Wilson, who won gold, and Valentin Starikov of Russia.

Senior career
In 2015, Bevan made his senior debut for the international squad competing at the European Games in Baku, where he won a bronze medal on the pommel horse.

Later that year he was chosen to compete at the 2015 World Artistic Gymnastics Championships in Glasgow, Scotland where he helped the team qualify for the 2016 Olympic Games. The team went on to win silver in the team finals, which was Britain's first team medal for the men (the women's team had made history by winning Britain's first ever team medal when they secured the bronze the previous evening). On 21 November Bevan was training on vault and after an odd landing he broke his fibula and tibia on his left leg and had to undergo surgery and months of physical therapy.

On 12 July 2016 he was selected for the 2016 British Olympic team along with Louis Smith, Nile Wilson, Kristian Thomas and Max Whitlock.

In March 2018, Bevan won the all-around title at the British Championships for the first time.

In late September 2019, Bevan competed at the Northern European Championships in Kópavogur, Iceland, where he won a gold medal on the pommel horse and a silver medal in the team event.

References

External links
 Official website
 
 
 
 
 

1997 births
Living people
British male artistic gymnasts
Medalists at the World Artistic Gymnastics Championships
European Games bronze medalists for Great Britain
Gymnasts at the 2016 Summer Olympics
Olympic gymnasts of Great Britain
Gymnasts at the 2015 European Games
Gymnasts at the 2019 European Games
European Games medalists in gymnastics
Welsh male artistic gymnasts
Gymnasts at the 2022 Commonwealth Games